Grand Chenier is an unincorporated community in Cameron Parish, Louisiana, United States. Its population is estimated at 352. Its ZIP code is 70643.

St. Eugene Catholic Church in Grand Chenier, which is affiliated with the Roman Catholic Diocese of Lake Charles, was established in 1961 by the Most Reverend Maurice Schexnayder, then the Bishop of Lafayette.

The McCall Cemetery in Grand Chenier is named for a pioneer Cameron Parish family, one of whose members, Thomas W. McCall, was for forty years the Cameron Parish school superintendent. Conway LeBleu, a son-in-law of Thomas McCall, was the state representative for Cameron Parish from 1964 to 1988. LeBleu and his wife, the former Virgie Annie McCall (1918-2016), one of the founders of the Cameron Parish Library, are interred at the McCall Cemetery.

References

Unincorporated communities in Louisiana
Unincorporated communities in Cameron Parish, Louisiana
Unincorporated communities in Lake Charles metropolitan area